Putrajaya–Cyberjaya Expressway, Federal Route 29, is a major expressway in Klang Valley, Malaysia. The 21.2 km (13.2 mi) expressway connects Serdang interchange on Damansara–Puchong Expressway to Kuala Lumpur International Airport (KLIA) in Sepang. It was named after the two sides of the MSC cities, Putrajaya and Cyberjaya.

Route background 
The kilometre marker for the expressway is a continuation from the E11 Damansara–Puchong Expressway; therefore, the Putrajaya–Cyberjaya Expressway assumes the same Kilometre Zero as the Damansara–Puchong Expressway.

History 
The road used to be known as the 15 state road from Puchong to Dengkil. Construction began in 1997 and was divided into four phases. The first phase was from the Damansara–Puchong Expressway to the Persiaran Utara interchange, the second from Persiaran Utara to Dengkil, the third from Dengkil to Sepang and the fourth from Sepang to Kuala Lumpur International Airport (KLIA). Phase 1 was completed in 1999, phase 2 in 2001 and phase 3 in 2006. Meanwhile, phase 4, connecting Sepang to KLIA, is expected to be completed in 2009.

Motorcycle lanes
There have been criticisms on the state of the expressway. Compared to other expressways, there are many hazards along certain stretches such as broken street lamps and dangerously uneven road surface. Most motorcyclists avoided using the designated lanes due to untrimmed tree branches jutting out into the lane, sand on the road, unlit tunnels and flooding.

Features 

Motorcycle lane
The first future federal highway on Multimedia Super Corridor
Arch bridge at major interchanges along the highway
Widest highway and interchange
Highway with ERL railway line
Highway between Putrajaya and Cyberjaya
Dengkil Lake Bridge

At most sections, the Federal Route 29 was built under the JKR R5 road standard, allowing maximum speed limit of up to 90 km/h.

List of interchanges

References

Highways in Malaysia
Expressways and highways in the Klang Valley
Malaysian Federal Roads
Sepang District
Roads in Selangor